4-hydroxynonenal-lysine is an epitope generated by the oxidative modification of low-density lipoprotein. It is formed by the direct addition of carbonyl groups from 4-hydroxynonenal (HNE) onto lysine.

References 

Antigenic determinant
Lipoproteins